The District of Metchosin is a municipality and community in Greater Victoria on the southern tip of Vancouver Island in British Columbia, Canada. It is a coastal community adjacent to the Strait of Juan de Fuca. Metchosin is part of the Western Communities and one of the 13 regional municipalities.

Climate
Metchosin has a warm-summer Mediterranean climate (Köppen: Csb) in parts caused by the rain shadow and to the east of the strait of the Strait of Juan de Fuca, but keeping some oceanic characteristics (Cfb). Sligo, Ireland has very close temperatures with only a slightly warmer summer. The biggest difference is in the summer drying, common of the Pacific Northwest.

Demographics 

Ethnicity

Religion 
According to the 2021 census, religious groups in Metchosin included:
Irreligion (3,120 persons or 66.2%)
Christianity (1,480 persons or 31.4%)
Buddhism (20 persons or 0.4%)
Other (80 persons or 1.7%)

Parks 
 Albert Head Lagoon Regional Park
 Blinkhorn Nature Park
 Buckbrush Swamp
 Devonian Regional Park
 Matheson Lake Regional Park
 Witty's Lagoon Regional Park
 Galloping Goose Regional Park

Notes

References

External links

District municipalities in British Columbia
Greater Victoria
Populated places in the Capital Regional District